Lough Swilly in Ireland is a glacial fjord or sea inlet lying between the western side of the Inishowen Peninsula and the Fanad Peninsula, in County Donegal. Along with Carlingford Lough and Killary Harbour it is one of three glacial fjords in Ireland.

Geography and ecology
Located on the Fanad Peninsula, in County Donegal, the northern extremities of the lough are marked by Fanad Head with its lighthouse and Dunaff Head. Towns situated on the lough include Buncrana on Inishowen and Rathmullan on the western side. At the southern end of the lough lies Letterkenny.

In the south of the lough a number of islands (Burt, Inch, Coney, Big Isle) were poldered and the land reclaimed during the 19th century for agriculture and the Londonderry and Lough Swilly Railway constructed embankments on the line from Derry to Letterkenny. These reclaimed lands are now wetlands associated with wildlife conservation and birdwatching, and support over 4,000 whooper swans and thousands of Greenland white front, barnacle, greylag and brent geese.

The lough is known for its wildlife-watching (dolphins, porpoise, seabirds, migratory geese and swans) and diving on a number of ship wrecks, including  sunk by a German mine (possible torpedo), which went down with 3,211 ingots of gold of which 3,191 were recovered.

History
The lough, and the Grianán Ailigh hill fort (early fortification and palace dating from 2000–5000 BC) at its southeastern bend, were recorded on Ptolemy's map of the world. It has a number of early Stone Age monuments and Iron Age fortifications along its shores, as well as a number of shell middens dated to approximately 7000 BC.

Swilly was the departure point for the 'Flight of the Earls' in 1607. This event, which followed a failed uprising in September 1607, saw Hugh O'Neill, 2nd Earl of Tyrone, and Rory O'Donnell, 1st Earl of Tyrconnell (the last Gaelic chieftains in Ireland at that time), set sail from Rathmullan with ninety of their followers.

During a gale on 4 December 1811, the Royal Navy 36-gun  was shipwrecked in Lough Swilly. There were no survivors out of the estimated 253 aboard, with approximately 200 bodies washed up on shore.

Due to its natural shelter and its depth, the lough was an important naval port. In October 1798, immediately prior to the outbreak of the Napoleonic wars, a French fleet carrying Wolfe Tone of the United Irishmen, plus troops to assist in 1798 rebellion, was intercepted and defeated in a naval battle at the entrance to Lough Swilly. Subsequently Tone was captured and taken ashore at Buncrana on the east side of the Swilly.

A subsequent reassessment of the threat of invasion led to the building of a series of fortifications guarding the different approaches and landing points within the lough which were completed between 1800 and 1820. Martello towers were built around 1804 to defend the approaches to Derry. The six on the lough cost €1,800 each, were armed with smoothbore cannon, firing round shot and were completed in six months. Immediately prior to the First World War the War Office improved the Napoleonic forts and their armaments as well as adding another fort at the entrance to the lough at Lenan Head with  guns (12-mile range) – the largest in Ireland at the time. The remains of these fortifications are still at Lenan Head Fort, Fort Dunree (now a military and wildlife museum), Ned's Point, Buncrana, Inch Fort and on the west coast at Rathmullan, Knockalla and Macamish Point.

During the First World War, the lough was used by the Royal Navy as an anchorage for elements of the Grand Fleet, an amalgamation of the pre-war Home and Atlantic Fleets, under Admiral Sir John R. Jellicoe and a gathering/staging point for Atlantic convoys. During this period a boom was placed across the lough between Macamish Point and Ned's Point, supported by a number of trawlers, to prevent U-boat attacks. After the Irish War of Independence the lough was also one of the Treaty Ports specified in the Anglo-Irish Treaty until its final handing over at Fort Dunree in 1938.

According to exhibits at Fort Dunree, during World War II Irish troops operated the guns there with explicit instructions to fire at any ship that might threaten Irish neutrality by entering the natural harbour. There was reportedly only one serious incident, when a Royal Navy ship entered the lough and did not initially respond to signals that it should turn back. However, the ship turned around before Irish forces fired upon it.

References

Notes

Sources

See also

List of loughs in Ireland
Londonderry and Lough Swilly Railway

Buncrana
Geography of Letterkenny
Sea loughs of the Republic of Ireland
Fjords of the Republic of Ireland
Landforms of County Donegal